Karla is a village in Ratnagiri, Maharashtra, India.

References

Villages in Ratnagiri district